A signifer was a standard bearer of the Roman legions. He carried a signum (standard) for a cohort or century. Each century had a signifer so there were 59 in a legion. Within each cohort, the first century's signifer would be the senior one. The -fer in signifer comes from ferre, the Latin for "to bear" or "to carry".

Standard-bearer
It had a number of phalarae (disks or medallions) along with a number of other elements mounted on a pole. The pole could be topped with a leaf-shaped spear head or a manus (open human hand) image denoting the oath of loyalty taken by the soldiers. It sometimes included a representation of a wreath, probably denoting an honour or award.

The task of carrying the signum in battle was dangerous, 
a soldier had to stand in the first rank and could carry only a small buckler. It was that banner that the men from each individual century would rally around. A soldier could also gain the position of discentes signiferorum, or standard bearer in training. If the signifer was lost in battle, the whole unit was dishonored.

Uniform

Although often depicted as such and adopted in modern re-enactments, signifers do not seem to have covered their helmets with wolf furs. Archaeological and literary sources indicate that standard bearers wore mostly bear furs and sometimes lion furs, and wolf skins are never mentioned.

Banker

In addition to carrying the signum, the signifer also assumed responsibility for the financial administration of the unit and functioned as the legionaries' banker. The Signifer was also a Duplicarius, paid twice the basic wage.

Roman Republic and Roman Empire

In the Roman Republic, the signifer probably applied to all standard bearers, but in the Roman Empire, the signifer was just one of a number of types of signiferi, which also included aquilifers, imaginifers, vexillarii and draconarii.

See also

Aquilifer
Imaginifer
Vexillarius

References

Sources
Zehetner, S. 2011: Der Signifer. Stellung und Aufgaben in der Kaiserzeitlichen Armee. VDM Verlag, Saarbrücken.

Military ranks of ancient Rome
Ancient Roman titles